Elections to the Andhra State Legislative Assembly were held on 11 February 1955. 581 candidates contested for the 167 constituencies in the Assembly. There were 29 two-member constituencies and 138 single-member constituencies. The members of the first assembly (1955–62) were allowed a seven-year term. That is to say in 1957, elections were conducted in the newly added region of Telangana alone and then in 1962 general elections were held for the state as a whole.

State Formation and Reorganization
On 1 October 1953, a separate Andhra State, consisting of the Telugu-speaking areas of the composite Madras State, with 167 constituencies with 190 seats in the Assembly, was formed. On 1 November 1956, Andhra State was merged with Hyderabad State under States Reorganisation Act, 1956, to form a single state, Andhra Pradesh. The districts of Raichur, Gulbarga, and the Marathwada district were detached from the Hyderabad State while merging with Andhra State. Besides, the Siruguppa taluk, the Bellary taluk, the Hospet taluk, and a small area of the Mallapuram sub-taluk were transferred from Mysore State to Andhra Pradesh. The districts of Raichur and Gulbarga were transferred to the Mysore State, while the Marathwada district was transferred to the Bombay State. This resulted in re-organization of assembly constituencies of Andhra Pradesh giving way to 85 constituencies with 105 seats in the assembly.

Results

Elected members

By-elections 
On 16 July 1955 a by-election was held for the Burugupudi seat after the death of the sitting MLA and State Minister for Agriculture N. Venkata Rama Rao. N. Venkataratnam of the Indian National Congress was elected unopposed.

In July 1955 a by-election was held for the Sarvepalli seat after the resignation of the sitting MLA Bezawada Gopala Reddy (who had won two seats in the assembly election, and had to resign from one of them). The election was won by the Indian National Congress candidate V.K. Reddi, won obtained 22,835 votes (60%), whilst the independent S.A. Reddi got 15,218 votes (40%). Whilst the Congress Party won the election by a comfortable margin, its percentage of the popular vote had decreased by 7.8%.

See also

 1955 elections in India
 1952 Hyderabad Legislative Assembly election
 1957 Andhra Pradesh Legislative Assembly election

References

Further reading
 
 
 
 

Andhra
1955
1955